Biên Hòa station is a railway station on the North–South railway (Reunification Express) in Vietnam. It serves the town of Biên Hòa, in Đồng Nai Province.

Buildings and structures in Đồng Nai province
Railway stations in Vietnam